In human anatomy, the artery of Adamkiewicz (also arteria radicularis magna) is the largest anterior segmental medullary artery. It typically arises from a left posterior intercostal artery at the level of the 9th to 12th intercostal artery, which branches from the aorta, and supplies the lower two-thirds of the spinal cord via the anterior spinal artery.

The artery is named after Albert Wojciech Adamkiewicz (August 11, 1850 – October 31, 1921), a Polish pathologist born in Żerków. It has several other names, including:

 Adamkiewicz artery
 great radicular artery of Adamkiewicz
 major anterior segmental medullary artery
 artery of the lumbar enlargement
 great anterior radiculomedullary artery
 great anterior segmental medullary artery

Structure

The blood supply of the spinal cord is complex and highly variable.
In a study of approximately 70 people that examined the spinal cord's blood supply it was found that:
 The Adamkiewicz artery sometimes arises from a lumbar vessel.
 In approximately 30% of people it arises from the right side.
 One quarter of people have two large anterior segmental medullary arteries.
In 75% of people, the artery of Adamkiewicz originates on the left side of the aorta between the T8 and L1 vertebral segments.

In an extensive literature review, recognition of the AKA using CT and/or MR was achieved in 466 of 555 cases (83.96%) and in 384 (83.3%) cases the AKA originated from a left intercostal artery.

Clinical significance
"Great radicular artery of Adamkiewicz… provides the major blood supply to the lumbar and sacral cord."

When damaged or obstructed, it can result in a syndrome of spinal cord ischemia, similar to anterior spinal artery syndrome, with loss of urinary and fecal continence and impaired motor function of the legs; sensory function is often preserved to a degree.

It is important to identify the location of the artery when surgically treating an aortic aneurysm to prevent damage which would result in insufficient blood supply to the spinal cord. In bronchial artery embolization for treatment of massive hemoptysis, one of the most serious complications is inadvertent occlusion of the artery of Adamkiewicz. Its location can be identified with computed tomographic angiography.

History
It is named for Albert Wojciech Adamkiewicz.

References

External links
 
A video showing the Adamkiewicz artery can be seen here: AKA finding using OsiriX

Arteries